F-actin-capping protein subunit alpha-2 also known as CapZ-alpha2 is a protein that in humans is encoded by the CAPZA2 gene.

Structure 

CapZ-alpha2 is a 33.0 kDa protein composed of 286 amino acids. CAPZA2 is located on human chromosome 7, position q31.2-q31.3. The primary sequence of CapZ-alpha2 contains three C-terminal, regularly spaced leucines at positions 258, 262 and 266 found in consensus sequence of KxxxLxxE/DLxxALxxK/R that are critical for actin binding; these residues are conserved within the CapZ-beta isoform. CapZ-alpha2 is 85% identical to CapZ-alpha1, and differ by a small number of key amino acids; 21 amino acid differences perpetrate isoform specificity. CapZ-alpha2 is expressed in a variety of tissues, including cardiac muscle and skeletal muscle, where it caps sarcomeric actin at Z-discs; the ratio of CapZ-alpha2 to CapZ-alpha1 varies significantly among different tissues.

Function 

CapZ binds the barbed end of actin filaments and prevents addition or loss of actin monomers to filaments. It has also been observed that CapZ functions to organize myofilaments during myofibrillogenesis and is present at Z-discs in muscle prior to the striation of actin filaments, suggesting that CapZ may function to direct the polarity and organization of sarcomeric actin during I-band formation. The function of CapZ-alpha2 may be modulated by the calcium-binding protein S100A in skeletal and cardiac muscle tissues, as crosslinking studies have shown S100A to directly interact with the C-terminal region of CapZ-alpha in the presence of calcium. CapZ appears to regulate intracellular signaling of contractile proteins in cardiac muscle. It has been demonstrated that the presence of CapZ at Z-discs modulates the ability of protein phosphatase 1 (PP1) to dephosphorylate cardiac myofilament proteins, including myosin binding protein C, troponin T and myosin regulatory light chain; likely because extraction of CapZ decreased the amount of myofilament-associated PP1.

Clinical Significance 
In humans undergoing exercise-induced muscle damage via 300 maximal eccentric contractions, skeletal muscle biopsies subjected to DNA microarrays showed that CapZ-alpha expression was upregulated, suggesting that CapZ-alpha may be involved in skeletal muscle growth and remodeling, and/or stress management.

Interactions 

CapZ-alpha2 has been shown to interact with:

 ACTA1 
 ACTC1
 S100A1

References

External links

Further reading 

 
 
 
 
 
 
 

Proteins